Thomas Henry Armstrong (born 2 April 1857, Dublin - died 23 March 1930) was a bishop of the Church of England in Australia (now the Anglican Church of Australia).

Education
He was educated at Geelong Grammar School, The Geelong College and Trinity College (University of Melbourne) (BA 1880, MA 1883). He was ordained deacon by Bishop James Moorhouse in December 1880 and priest in 1881,

Ordained ministry
He was curate of Christ Church, St Kilda (1881–83) and Christ Church, Hawthorn (1883), first vicar of St Columb's, Hawthorn (1883–94), and Archdeacon of Gippsland (1894–1902). He was rural dean of Sale (1896–99), and a canon of St Paul's Cathedral, Melbourne and examining chaplain to the Bishop of Melbourne (1899–1902).

On 24 February 1902 he was consecrated as the first Bishop of Wangaratta. During his tenure the bishop's lodge was built, St Columb's Hall for the education of clergy established and a cathedral partially completed.

In 1903 he was awarded an honorary DD by the University of Trinity College, Toronto, Ontario, Canada.

He retired on 31 March 1927 and became acting incumbent of St John's Toorak and was president of the Melbourne College of Divinity in 1930.

Family
He married Marion Ruth Henty on 19 May 1892.

Sources

1857 births
1930 deaths
Christian clergy from Dublin (city)
Anglican bishops of Wangaratta
Wangaratta
People educated at Geelong Grammar School
People educated at Geelong College
People educated at Trinity College (University of Melbourne)
University of Melbourne alumni
Irish emigrants to colonial Australia